The LaBarre House, in Assumption Parish, Louisiana, near Napoleonville, Louisiana, was built in 1909.  It was listed on the National Register of Historic Places in 2008.

Architecture: Queen Anne Free Classic

Develop about Queen Anne free classic per this nom doc's discussion from McAlester.

References

Historic sites in progress
National Register of Historic Places in Assumption Parish, Louisiana
Queen Anne architecture in Louisiana
Houses completed in 1909